Srebrenka Golić (born 29 July 1958) is a Bosnian politician and lawyer in Republika Srpska. She has served as Minister of Physical Planning, Civil Engineering and Ecology since 2010, deputy prime minister since 2015 and was acting Prime Minister from 19 November to 18 December 2018.

Early life and career
Golić graduated from high school and law studies in Banja Luka. She worked as a lawyer in enterprises and local administration, as well as head of the office of the prime minister's adviser and director of the official journal of Republika Srpska.

Political career
Golić became involved in activities within the Alliance of Independent Social Democrats, taking the position of secretary to the party's main board. In 2010, she was nominated to the position of Minister of Physical Planning, Civil Engineering and Ecology in Aleksandar Džombić's cabinet, and retained her in two more offices in Željka Cvijanović's cabinet. On 3 February 2015, she was also appointed deputy prime minister. After Cvijanović took the presidency, Golić temporarily served as Prime Minister from 19 November to 18 December 2018.

Personal life
Golić is married and has one child. She is of Bosniak ethnicity.

References

External links

1958 births
Living people
People from Banja Luka
Bosniaks of Bosnia and Herzegovina
Bosnia and Herzegovina women in politics
21st-century women politicians
Alliance of Independent Social Democrats politicians
Prime ministers of Republika Srpska
University of Banja Luka alumni